Rachid Ofrany (born 17 January 1987) is a Dutch-Moroccan former professional footballer who played as a right winger.

Club career
Ofrany started playing football with Swift'36 from his hometown, Roermond. He was admitted to VVV-Venlo's youth team from a young age, and played for all youth teams, until reaching the first team in summer 2006.

In the 2006–07 season, Ofrany made his debut for VVV on 11 August 2006 in the match against FC Eindhoven. The game ended 1–1, with Ofrany playing all 90 minutes. Shortly after the match, he was offered a professional contract with the club with him signing until 2010. VVV promoted to the Eredivisie, and he had a memorable moment in that season. In the 2–2 match against Ajax, he scored a lob from the half-way line in the 57th minute. 

On 26 July 2009, it was announced that Ofrany moved to AGOVV on loan. After his return to VVV, he suffered a double fracture in his leg at the end of October 2010. He never fully recovered from this. In 2011, Ofrany left VVV. After a short period at Fortuna Sittard and unsuccessful trials in Thailand, Indonesia and Morocco, Ofrany decided to retire permanently from professional football in 2013.

References

External links
 
 Profile at Voetbal International

Living people
1987 births
People from Roermond
Dutch sportspeople of Moroccan descent
Dutch footballers
Footballers from Limburg (Netherlands)
Association football wingers
Netherlands youth international footballers
Eredivisie players
Eerste Divisie players
VVV-Venlo players
AGOVV Apeldoorn players
Fortuna Sittard players